Attorney General Greene may refer to:

Albert C. Greene (1792–1863), Attorney General of Rhode Island
John Greene Jr. (1620–1708), Attorney General of the Colony of Rhode Island
Ray Greene (politician) (1765–1849), Attorney General of Rhode Island

See also
General Greene (disambiguation)
Brad Green (politician) (born 1965), Attorney General of New Brunswick